Guixers is a municipality in the province of Lleida, Catalonia, Spain

References

External links
 Official website
 Government data pages 

Municipalities in Solsonès
Populated places in Solsonès